The following is a list of Teen Choice Award winners and nominees for Choice Sci-Fi/Fantasy Movie Actor. Sometimes it is awarded as two separate categories: Choice Sci-Fi Movie Actor and Choice Fantasy Movie Actor.

Winners/Nominees

References

Sci-Fi/Fantasy Actor